Brittney Shannon Tam (born 23 August 1997) is a Canadian badminton player. In 2012, she won a silver medal at the Pan Am Junior Badminton Championships in the mixed doubles event. In 2016, she won the gold medal in the mixed team event at the Pan Am Badminton Championships. In the individual event, she won the gold medals in the women's singles and mixed doubles event. She competed at the 2018 Commonwealth Games in Gold Coast.

Achievements

Pan Am Championships 
Women's singles

Mixed doubles

Pan Am Junior Championships 
Mixed doubles

BWF International Challenge/Series (1 title, 1 runner-up) 
Women's singles

  BWF International Challenge tournament
  BWF International Series tournament

References

External links 
 
 

Living people
1997 births
Sportspeople from Toronto
Canadian female badminton players
Badminton players at the 2018 Commonwealth Games
Commonwealth Games competitors for Canada